Separados (International Title: Better Off Single) is a Chilean telenovela originally aired on TVN.

Cast
 Luz Valdivieso as Carolina Cavada
 Álvaro Rudolphy as Jaime Mathews
 Sigrid Alegría as Verónica Infante
 Jorge Zabaleta as Pedro Armstrong
 Fernando Larraín as Emilio Marambio
 Alejandra Fosalba as Macarena Damilano
 Andrés Velasco as Mateo Fernández
 Rodrigo Muñoz as Antonio "Toñito" García
 Francisca Gavilán as Rosario Aranda
 Coca Guazzini as María Isabel Correa
 Jaime Vadell as Álvaro Cavada
 Daniela Ramírez as Amanda Valenzuela
 Sebastián Goya as Andrés Beneyto
 Valeska Díaz as Javiera Mathews
 Ignacio Susperreguy as Pablo Marambio
 Nicolás Vigneaux as Vicente Armstrong
 Rosita Vial as Camila Amstrong
 Margarita Sánchez as Teresita Marambio

Special participations
 Daniel de la Vega as Psicologo
 María José Prieto as Claudia Armstrong
 Amaya Forch as Maite Subercaseaux
 Ignacia Allamand as Josefa Matte
 Javiera Cifuentes as Ana Fonseca
 Remigio Remedy as Alejandro Lamarca
 Lorena Capetillo as Fabiola Pérez
 Sebastián Layseca as Ignacio Mathews
 Javiera Acevedo as ¿?
 Santiago Tupper as Nicolás Ramírez
 Óscar Hernández as Sergio Beneyto
 Teresa Hales as Pamela Martini, Psicologa de Jaime
 Silvia Novak as Sonia Jaramillo
 Luis Wigdorsky as Héctor Santibañez
 Sergio Silva as Leonel "Guatón" Riquelme
 Matías Stevens as Gabriel
 María Contreras as Patricia
 Fernando Olivares as Sebastián
 Pedro Rivadeneira as Cristián
 Sebastián Arrigorriaga as Francisco
 Julián Castagno as Óscar, Maite's friend
 Marcela Arroyave as Prostituta
 Andrés Pozo as Sicólogo
 Ivana Llanos as Jaime's patient
 Jocelyn Medina as Odalisca
 Nataly Masinari as Promotora'
 Sandy Boquita as Sandy

See also
 Televisión Nacional de Chile

External links
 Official website 

2012 telenovelas
2012 Chilean television series debuts
2013 Chilean television series endings
Chilean telenovelas
Spanish-language telenovelas
Televisión Nacional de Chile telenovelas